Aladdin from Broadway is a 1917 silent adventure film directed by William Wolbert and starring Edith Storey, Antonio Moreno and Otto Lederer.

Cast
 Edith Storey as Faimeh
 Antonio Moreno as Jack Stanton
 William Duncan as William Fitzgerald
 Otto Lederer as Amad
 Laura Winston as Light-of-Life
 George Holt as Sadi

References

Bibliography
 Robert B. Connelly. The Silents: Silent Feature Films, 1910-36, Volume 40, Issue 2. December Press, 1998.

External links
 

1917 films
1917 adventure films
American silent feature films
American adventure films
American black-and-white films
Vitagraph Studios films
Films directed by William Wolbert
1910s English-language films
1910s American films
Silent adventure films